Maria mole (literally, "limp Mary") is a dessert popular in Brazil that is similar to a marshmallow. Maria mole's base ingredients are sugar, gelatine and egg whites. It is usually covered in grated coconut and made without the addition of any other flavors, although there are variations. 

The dessert was created by Antonio Bergamo, a Brazilian candy maker of Italian descent. While trying to use leftover egg whites, he managed to make a firm meringue and decided to add gelatine to it. After the meringue was cool, he noted that it hadn't gotten as firm as he expected, and called it Maria Mole ("soft" or "limp" Mary).

See also
List of Brazilian dishes
 List of Brazilian sweets and desserts

References

Brazilian desserts
Marshmallows